Jebu Donga may refer to

 Jebu Donga (1975 film)
 Jebu Donga (1987 film)